Sungai Pinang is a residential neighbourhood along the Pinang River within the city of George Town in Penang, Malaysia. The neighbourhood, bounded by the river to the north and Jalan Sungai Pinang to the south, is also geographically part of the Jelutong suburb.

The neighbourhood includes a number of Malay and Indian villages, some of which have a history dating back to the 18th century.

Etymology 
The neighbourhood of Sungai Pinang was named after the Pinang River, which, in turn, is named after the Pinang palm, scientifically known as areca catechu.

History 

The Malay and Indian villages along the Pinang River date back to the 18th century, possibly predating Captain Francis Light's arrival on Penang Island in 1786. Sumatran traders had arrived at the river's estuary in the 1780s and established settlements like Kampung Rawa and Kampung Makam. Ethnic Tamils also settled along the river; whilst some professed their Muslim faith, others retained their Hindu beliefs and built a handful of Hindu temples along the river bank.

The existence of Muslim and Hindu places of worship located adjacent to one another had in the past provoked racial and religious tensions. In 1998, a minor religious clash broke out over the relocation of a Hindu temple at Kampung Rawa. What had begun as an altercation over the relatively trivial issue of the noise levels of the Hindu prayer bells turned deadly, leaving four fatalities. Almost 200 rioters were arrested in response to the incident.

Among the more recent issues affecting this neighbourhood are the pollution of the Pinang River and perennial flash floods, as the neighbourhood sits on low-lying land adjacent to the river. Efforts have been made by the Penang state government to clean up the Pinang River and alleviate the flash floods, including the use of technology and river dredging works.

Transportation 
Rapid Penang buses 12, 301, 302, 303 and 401 serve the neighbourhood, by connecting it with George Town to the north and other destinations within the southern side of Penang Island, including Bukit Jambul, Bayan Baru, Bayan Lepas, Batu Maung and Balik Pulau.

Education 
There is one Tamil-medium primary school and a Japanese international school within the Sungai Pinang neighbourhood.

Primary school
 SRJK (T) Jalan Sungai
International school
 Penang Japanese School

References 

Neighbourhoods in George Town, Penang